Ranganatha, also known as Ranganathar, Rangan, Aranganathar, Sri Ranga, and Thenarangathan, is a Hindu deity with his origin in South India, serving as the chief deity of the Sri Ranganathaswamy Temple, Srirangam. The deity is a resting form of Vishnu, recumbent on the great form of the serpent demigod Adishesha, the king of the serpents. His primary consort is the Goddess Lakshmi, also known as Ranganayaki. The two other consorts seen next to his recumbent figure are Bhudevi and Nila Devi. Most of the deities portray a 'smiling' lord in a sleeping or reclining position over the celestial serpent Adishesha in the sea of cosmic dissolution (pralaya). This is the form in which he is open to listening to all of his devotees' woes, and blesses them. Apart from being worshipped by all Hindus, this form is of particular importance to the Sri Vaishnava community. His name in Sanskrit means "leader of the place of assembly", coined from the two Sanskrit words ranga (place) and natha (lord or leader).

Symbolic representation of Ranganatha and Nataraja has been compared as the meaning of both is the same except for their locations. In Ranganatha, ranga means "stage" and which in the broadest sense refers to "the world, the cosmos or better still of the body and the senses". Nataraja also means the "Lord of the Stage" and in this case his stage is in ‘Chidambaram’ meaning the "sphere of wisdom", while Ranganatha rests on the Ocean of milk or Thiruparkadal, which is a metaphysical or esoteric concept which is not easy to interpret as it is perceived in different ways by different people. The name "Nataraja" is more usually taken to mean Lord of the Dance in reference to the dance of dissolution, or pralaya, or alternatively the dance of illusion by which the material sphere is manifested, and is therefore a name for Lord Shiva, as distinct from Lord Vishnu.

There is also a famous temple dedicated to Shree Ranganatha swamy in Shakarayapatna in Chikmagalur district in the southern region of Karnataka.

Temples

The Pancharanga Kshetrams are the five most sacred Ranganatha temples that are located on the banks of the Kaveri River, also spelled as Cauvery. The five Pancharanga Kshetrams in the order of their successive locations, on the banks of the Kaveri River are: The Srirangapatna (Karnataka) called the Adi Ranga, the first temple on the banks of the Kaveri River from the upstream side; the Srirangam, Trichy in Tamil Nadu known as Antha Ranga (the last temple), Appalarangam or Koviladi at Tiurppernagar in Tamil Nadu, and Vatarangam near Sirkazhi, also listed as Sri Renganatha Perumal Temple, Vadarengam, Tamil Nadu, 609108. The Sarangapani temple at Kumbakonam is mentioned in place of Vatarangam in some references.

Parasara Battar, well known poet of the times who has written a commentary on "Vishnu Sahasranama" (thousand names of Lord Vishnu) has noted the beautiful image of Ranganatha at Srirangam temple as ornamented with basil (tulsi) garland on the chest (favorite of Vishnu), Kaustubha, Vaijayanthi hara (a necklace) and a few other ornaments, which once formed the divine jewelry of Krishna, the avatar (incarnation) of Vishnu, are also decorating the image of Ranganatha.

The Ranganatha temple is also the religious center of Sri Vaishnavism propagated by Saint Ramanuja from Srirangam. The temple worship at the Ranganatha Swamy temples is done traditionally in the Tamil and Sanskrit scriptures written by the 12 Alvars and Ramanuja.

Also, Kaveri River forms three small sacred islands in its river stretch in Karnataka and Tamil Nadu at Adi Ranga, at Srirangapatna, Madhya Ranga at Sri Ranganathaswamy Temple, Shivanasamudra and Antya Ranga or Adya Ranga at Srirangam where Ranganatha temple is located.

Also among the 108 Divya Desams (sacred places of worship of Lord Vishnu), the reclining posture of the God can be found in many temples. Some of these temples are at Thirumayam, Thirukoshtiyur, Koviladi, Kapisthalam, Thiruneermalai, Tiruvallur, Anbil, Appokudathan, Mayiladuthurai, Srivilliputhur, and Padmanabhaswamy temple at Tiruvanathapuram.

There are many other Ranganatha temples spread over many towns and villages of South India and to mention a few are: Pallikonda Ranganatha where his three consorts Shri Devi, Bhudevi and Nila Devi are also deified next to Ranganatha; At Singavaram, a rock cut reclining image of Ranganatha, which measures . Other notable temples of Ranganatha are at Nellore, Namakkal and Bangalore, {Sri Varadhahastha aanjaneya swamy sametha sri ranganatha swamy temple}, {Narasambhudhi}, {Agali Mandal}, {Ananthapuramu District}, {AP}.

There are also temples dedicated to Lord Ranganatha outside of South Asia. For example, there is a Sri Ranganatha Temple at the village of Pomona in New York. Another Sri Ranganatha Temple at Skanda Vale, in the United Kingdom. Another famous Sri Ranganatha temple is located at Sri Rangapuram village in Wanaparthy district in Telangana State. The Perumal is Swyambhu here and very ancient temple of historical importance.

References

other

External links

Srirangam, Temple Information
 Shri Rang Nath Ji Temple, Vrindavan
Sri Ranganathaswamy Temple, Sri Rangam (archived 20 February 2007)
 Pomona, Temple Information

Forms of Vishnu